Caecilia pachynema is a species of amphibian in the family Caeciliidae. It is found in Colombia and Ecuador. Its natural habitats are subtropical or tropical moist montane forests and rivers. It is threatened by habitat loss.

References

pachynema
Amphibians of Colombia
Amphibians of Ecuador
Amphibians described in 1859
Taxa named by Albert Günther
Taxonomy articles created by Polbot